Mark Davies is a former Wales International Rugby Union player. A flanker, Davies began his rugby career at Maesteg Comprehensive School and Nantyfyllon RFC before joining Swansea.

He made his debut for the Wales on 5 December 1981 versus Australia and went on to attain 3 caps for Wales between 1981 and 1985.

Davies has been involved with the Wales national rugby union team in non-playing roles since 1991 and joined the Welsh Rugby Union as a full-time member of staff in August, 1999.

References

1958 births
Living people
Rugby union players from Maesteg
Swansea RFC players
Newport HSOB RFC players
Welsh rugby union players
Wales international rugby union players